The 2011 season of the Moroccan Throne Cup was the 55th edition of the competition.

5th Round 
The fifth round is the last preliminary round, with 32 teams from the 3rd and 2nd divisions of the Moroccan football championship:

Last 32

Final phases

Last 16

Quarter-finals

Semi-finals

Final

Winner

Prize Fund 

 Total fund: 3.5 million MAD,
 Winner: 1.5 million MAD,
 Finalist (2nd place) : 1 million MAD,
 Semi-finalists (3rd and 4th places): 0.5 Million MAD each.

See also 

 2009–10 Botola

Notes and references

External links 
  Site of the FRMF
  Moroccan Throne Cup news

2009
2010–11 in Moroccan football